Lycomorphodes heringi is a moth of the family Erebidae. It was described by Reich in 1933. It is found in Brazil.

References

 Natural History Museum Lepidoptera generic names catalog

Cisthenina
Moths described in 1933